Elmer Parker Yates (December 19, 1917 – August 14, 2011) was a major general in the United States Army Corps of Engineers who saw service in the Vietnam War.  He was the younger brother of United States Air Force Lieutenant General Donald Norton Yates.

Yates was born in Bangor, Maine, to Archie O. and Gertrude A. (Wilson) Yates and attended Bangor High School.  He spent one year at the Stanton Preparatory Academy in Cornwall, New York, before entering the United States Military Academy in 1937. Yates graduated second in the West Point class of 1941, winning three of the fifteen available academic awards, including the Robert E. Lee Saber for the highest standing in mathematics. On graduation he entered the U.S. Army Corps of Engineers.

Yates did two tours of duty as a senior officer during the Vietnam War. In 1966 he was deputy chief of the Engineering Division of the U.S. Army Vietnam.  In 1969–1970 he was director of construction in Vietnam, with the rank of brigadier general.

In 1966–68 Yates was chief engineer of the Corps' Philadelphia District, and was also briefly chief engineer of the North Pacific Division, headquartered in Portland, Oregon, and responsible for the Columbia River Basin. In 1971 he became director of installations in the Office of the Deputy Chief of Staff for Logistics with the rank of major general.

Footnotes

1917 births
2011 deaths
United States Military Academy alumni
United States Army generals
United States Army personnel of the Vietnam War
People from Bangor, Maine
Bangor High School (Maine) alumni